Marek Sapara (born 31 July 1982) is a Slovak professional footballer who plays as a midfielder for OŠK Bešeňová. He was an assistant manager at MFK Ružomberok. Sapara appeared at the FIFA 2010 World Cup in South Africa.

Club career

Rosenborg
Sapara joined Rosenborg in 2006, making his debut for the Norwegian side on 10 September 2006 in a match against Sandefjord. On 26 September, he scored his first goal for the club against Odd Grenland.

Trabzonspor
September 2011, Sapara joined Trabzonspor along with Róbert Vittek, for a transfer fee of €200,000. On 5 January 2012, he went on loan to Gaziantepspor until the end of the 2011–12 season.

Return to Ružomberok
In 2015 Sapara returned to MFK Ružomberok, where he ended his career in 2018. He then became an assistant coach of Ján Haspra at Ružomberok's reserve team. In June 2019, Haspra and Sapara moved on to manage the first team.

International career
Sapara was a part of the Slovakia U21 national team. He made his debut for the senior side in 2005.

Career statistics
Scores and results list Slovakia's goal tally first, score column indicates score after each Sapara goal.

Honours
MFK Ružomberok
Slovak Super Liga: 2005–06
Slovak Cup: 2005–06

Rosenborg
Tippeligaen: 2006, 2009

Trabzonspor
Turkish Cup runner-up: 2012–13

Gaziantepspor
Spor Toto Cup: 2012

Individual
Tippeligaen player of the month: October 2006

References

External links
Player profile from RBKweb
Player profile from RBKweb (nor)

1982 births
Living people
People from Košice-okolie District
Sportspeople from the Košice Region
Slovak footballers
Association football midfielders
Slovakia international footballers
2010 FIFA World Cup players
Slovak Super Liga players
Eliteserien players
Süper Lig players
FC VSS Košice players
MFK Ružomberok players
Rosenborg BK players
MKE Ankaragücü footballers
Trabzonspor footballers
Gaziantepspor footballers
Ankaraspor footballers
Slovak expatriate footballers
Slovak expatriate sportspeople in Norway
Expatriate footballers in Norway
Slovak expatriate sportspeople in Turkey
Expatriate footballers in Turkey